Detonation is a Dutch death metal band, with members from the Netherlands and the United States. In recent years, the band has gravitated towards a less thrashy melodic death metal sound.

History 
Detonation was founded in 1997 under the name Infernal Dream. The band started out with Koen Romeijn on vocals/guitar, Mike Ferguson on guitar, and Thomas Kalksma on drums. In August 1998, Otto Schimmelpenninck van der Oije joined the band as bass player. The band's name was changed to Detonation in 1998 and entered a studio for the first time to record two songs for the Crushed Skull Compilation Volume 1 CD. A month later, Detonation performed live for the first time. The Crushed Skull compilation was released in January 1999 through Skull Crusher Records.

In October of that same year, the band entered the studio for the second time to record the MCD Lost Euphoria, which contained four songs. Lost Euphoria was released in January 2000 through Skull Crusher Records. After the release, Detonation played ten shows as the supporting act for the Dutch metal band Orphanage.

In March 2001, Detonation entered the studio again to record three new songs that were to be released as a promo CD meant primarily for labels and venues. After playing numerous shows, which also included Detonation's first show outside The Netherlands (Open Hell Fest in the Czech Republic), the band decided to record their debut studio album, An Epic Defiance. The album was recorded within two weeks at Studio Excess and contained twelve songs. The artwork was done by Niklas Sundin (Dark Tranquillity) for Cabin Fever Media.

On 19 October 2002, An Epic Defiance was self-released and sent to record labels. The album caught the attention of the French record label, Osmose Productions and Detonation signed a recording contract for three albums. An Epic Defiance was officially re-released worldwide on CD and limited LP on 19 June 2003. In July 2003, Detonation successfully completed their first foreign tour, playing three shows throughout England. After promoting the album in the Netherlands, the band again headed to the UK to successfully complete a ten-day tour throughout the country.

In February 2004, Detonation took part in a thirteen-day European tour as a support act for Dimension Zero along with Immemorial. In August 2004, the band was forced to recruit a session drummer due to an arm injury of Thomas. Fedor Tieleman of the Dutch band M-90's was recruited as the session member.

In December 2004, Detonation entered Excess Studios once again to record their second studio album, Portals to Uphobia. Due to numerous problems the official release date was delayed until 12 September 2005. Detonation then toured with Decapitated, Gorerotted, and Dam. Over 30 shows were scheduled throughout Europe, but due to a breakdown of the rented tour bus, Detonation had to cancel several shows. The band eventually managed to complete about half of the shows with their own transportation.

In January 2007, Detonation recorded their third studio album, Emission Phase, which was released at the end of April 2007. The artwork was made by Eliran Kantor and the production was taken care of by Bouke Visser and Jochem Jacobs from Split Second Sound. The release was promoted by an eight-day tour throughout the UK and several individual gigs (festival) in the Netherlands.

On 17 March 2008, the band announced their first ever line-up change. Koen Romeijn who had been playing rhythmic guitar/vocals since 1997 decided to lay down his guitar and focus on the vocals. The person they chose to replace him was Danny Tunker from Fuelblooded and The Saturnine.

On 3 May 2008, Detonation announced that their drummer Thomas Kalksma (who was also a forming member of the band) had decided to leave the band for differences of opinion about the future of Detonation. He left in good terms and mentioned that he would continue his drummer career.

In November 2008, Michiel van der Plicht joined the band as the permanent new drummer, after already doing a couple of shows as session member. At the end of 2011, the band recorded their fourth studio effort "Reprisal", produced by Harry van Breda. It was released in April 2011. Before the album was released, Michiel van der Plicht, Danny Tunker and Otto Schimmelpenninck van der Oije left the band to focus and their other bands (God Dethroned and Delain, respectively). Harry van Breda filled out as bass guitar player while Allard van der Kuip joined as drummer.

In 2012, the band announced a hiatus for an undetermined period of time, but reformed in 2013 with an original bassist and a new drummer.

Line-up

Current members 
 Koen Romeijn – vocals, rhythm guitar (1997–present)
 Mike Ferguson – lead guitar (1997–present)
 Harry van Breda – bass (2011–2012)
 Allard van der Kuip – drums (2011–2012; died 2021)

Session members 
 Fedor Tieleman – drums (2004)

Former members 
 Thomas Kalksma – drums (1997–2008)
 Otto Schimmelpenninck van der Oije – bass (1998–2011)
 Danny Tunker – rhythm guitar (2008–2011)
 Michiel van der Plicht – drums (2008–2011)

Timeline

Discography

Studio albums 
 An Epic Defiance (2002, re-released in 2003)
 Portals to Uphobia (2005)
 Emission Phase (2007)
 Reprisal (2010)

Other releases 
 Crushed Skull Volume 1 (compilation, 1999)
 Lost Euphoria (MCD, 2000)
 Promo 2001 (promo CD, 2001)

References

External links 
Detonation – official website
Detonation at Encyclopaedia Metallum

Dutch heavy metal musical groups
Dutch death metal musical groups
Dutch melodic death metal musical groups
Musical groups established in 1997
Musical quintets